Rumble Tumble is a 1998 suspense crime novel written by American author Joe R. Lansdale. It is the fifth in the series of his  Hap and Leonard mysteries. According to WorldCat, it is held in 573 libraries.

Plot summary
The story centers around Hap's girlfriend Brett's daughter Tillie, who has spent the majority of her adult life as a prostitute, and is suffering abuse at the hands of her pimp. Hap and Leonard attempt to rescue her, and come into conflict with the Dixie Mafia as a result. The two protagonists end up traveling from Oklahoma to the Mexican border, with much violence taking place along with way.

Editions
This book was initially published as a limited edition by Subterranean Press and then as a trade hardcover by Mysterious Press. Both of these editions are out of print. Vintage Crime/Black Lizard published a trade paperback in 2009.

References

External links
Author's Official Website
Paperback Publisher's website
Author's Publisher Website

Novels by Joe R. Lansdale
American crime novels
1998 American novels
Novels set in Texas
Works by Joe R. Lansdale
Subterranean Press books